The Barito languages are around twenty Austronesian languages of Indonesia (Borneo), Southern Philippines, plus Malagasy, the national language of Madagascar.

The Barito subgroup was first proposed by Hudson (1967),<ref>Hudson, Alfred B. 1967. The Barito isolects of Borneo: A classification based on comparative
reconstruction and lexicostatistics. Data Paper no. 68, Southeast Asia Program, Department of Asian Studies, Cornell University. Ithaca, N.Y.: Cornell University,</ref> comprising the three branches East Barito, West Barito, and Mahakam (Barito–Mahakam). It is thought by some to be a Sprachbund rather than a genuine clade. For example, Adelaar (2005) rejects Barito as a valid group despite accepting less traditional groups such as North Bornean and Malayo-Sumbawan.

The Malagasy language originates from the Southeast Barito languages, and Ma'anyan is its closest relative, with numerous Malay (close to Indonesian) and Javanese loanwords.There are also some Sulawesi loanwords, which Adelaar attributes to contact prior to the migration to Madagascar: See K. Alexander Adelaar, “The Indonesian Migrations to Madagascar: Making Sense of the Multidisciplinary Evidence”, in Truman Simanjuntak, Ingrid Harriet Eileen Pojoh and Muhammad Hisyam (eds.), Austronesian Diaspora and the Ethnogeneses of People in Indonesian Archipelago, (Jakarta: Indonesian Institute of Sciences, 2006), pp. 8–9. It known that Ma'anyan people were brought as labourers and slaves by Malay and Javanese people in their trading fleets, which reached Madagascar by ca. 50–500 AD.

Greater Barito
Blust (2006) proposes that the Sama-Bajaw languages also derive from the Barito lexical region, though not from any established group, and Ethnologue has followed, calling the resulting group 'Greater Barito'.

Smith (2017, 2018)Smith, Alexander D. 2018. The Barito Linkage Hypothesis, with a Note on the Position of Basap. JSEALS Volume 11.1 (2018). proposes a Greater Barito linkage with the following branches, and considers Basap to be a sister of the Greater Barito linkage, forming a Basap–Greater Barito'' group.
Basap–Greater Barito
Basap
Greater Barito
Northwest Barito (Kadorih, Siang, Murung)
Southwest Barito (Ngaju, Kapuas, Bakumpai)
Sama–Bajaw (Yakan, etc.)
Southeast Barito (Ma'anyan, Dusun Witu, Malagasy)
Central-East Barito (Dusun Malang, Dusun Bayang, Paku, Semihim)
Northeast Barito (Taboyan, Lawangan, Bentian, Pasir, Benuaq)
Tunjung

The earlier groupings East Barito (comprising Smith's Southeast Barito, Central-East Barito and Northeast Barito) and West Barito (comprising Southwest Barito and Northwest Barito) are rejected by Smith.

West Kalimantan groups

Some Barito-speaking Dayak ethnic subgroups and their respective languages in West Kalimantan province, Indonesia:

{| class="wikitable"
! Group !! Subgroup !! Language !! Regency
|-
| Oruung Da'an ||  || Oruung Da'an || Kapuas Hulu
|-
| Pangin ||  || Pangin || Melawi
|-
| Uud Danum || Cihie || Cihie || Sintang
|-
| Uud Danum || Dohoi || Dohoi || Sintang
|}

References

 
Basap–Barito languages
Languages of Madagascar
Languages of Indonesia